Roine Sven Torbjörn Karlsson (12 November 1943 – 17 February 2013) was a Swedish race walker. He competed in the 20 km event at the 1964 Summer Olympics where he placed 20th. Aged 20, he was the youngest Swedish track and field athlete at those games.

References

1943 births
2013 deaths
Athletes (track and field) at the 1964 Summer Olympics
Olympic athletes of Sweden
Swedish male racewalkers
Sportspeople from Uppsala